John Charles Halland How OGS (16 September 1881 – 22 May 1961) was an Anglican bishop.

Family and education 
Born to Charles How, a draper, and Elizabeth Halland, he was educated at Pocklington School and St John's College, Cambridge. 

How was married twice: first in 1925 to Junie Katherine Reynolds (who died in 1938), and second in 1939 to Barbara Collcutt. His son by his first marriage was the organist and composer Martin How.

Career
How was ordained in 1906 and began his career at the Wellington College Mission, Walworth. From 1906 he was Lecturer in Hebrew at St John's College. He was a Temporary Chaplain to the Forces from 1915 to 1919, eventually serving in Egypt. He was regarded as 'manly' and popular, and a good preacher and lecturer. He could speak French and  Arabic. 

In 1920 he became warden of the OGS Oratory House, Cambridge. Following this he became an honorary canon of Liverpool Cathedral in 1922 and in 1924 became the missioner in the Diocese of Manchester. In 1926, he became rector of St Nicholas' Church in Liverpool. Simultaneously he also became Rural Dean of Liverpool in 1930. He resigned both posts to become vicar of West Blatchington, Sussex in 1935. How served as an Honorary Chaplain to the King from 1933 to 1938 and as a canon of Chichester Cathedral. 

How was elected Bishop of Glasgow and Galloway in 1938. Eight years later, on 18 June 1946, he became Primus of Scotland, a post he held until his retirement in 1952. 

How died on 22 May 1961.

References

1881 births
People educated at Pocklington School
Alumni of St John's College, Cambridge
Honorary Chaplains to the King
Bishops of Glasgow and Galloway
Primuses of the Scottish Episcopal Church
20th-century Scottish Episcopalian bishops
Members of Anglican religious orders
1961 deaths